St James's GAA may refer to:

St James' GAA (Cork), a sports club in Ardfield–Rathbarry, Ireland
St James' GAA (Galway), a sports club in Doughiska, Ireland